Tibelevo (Tibel) is a rural locality (a village) in Shavyadinsky Selsoviet, Baltachevsky District, Bashkortostan, Russia. The population was 189 as of 2010. There are 3 streets.

Geography 
Tibelevo is located 14 km north of Starobaltachevo (the district's administrative centre) by road. Shavyady is the nearest rural locality.

References 

Rural localities in Baltachevsky District